Alessandro Sala (born 7 May 2001) is an Italian professional footballer who plays as a midfielder for  club Pro Sesto.

Club career
On 16 July 2021, he joined Renate on loan.

On 22 January 2022, he returned to Pro Sesto on a permanent basis.

Career statistics

Club

References

2001 births
Living people
People from Sesto San Giovanni
Italian footballers
Italy youth international footballers
Association football midfielders
Serie C players
A.C. Milan players
Cesena F.C. players
Pro Sesto 2013 players
A.C. Renate players
Footballers from Lombardy
Sportspeople from the Metropolitan City of Milan